The 2019 South American U-17 Championship is an international association football tournament held in Peru from 21 March to 14 April 2019. The ten national teams involved in the tournament were required to register a squad of 23 players; only players in these squads are eligible to take part in the tournament.

All registered players had to have been born on or after 1 January 2002. The age listed for each player is on 21 March 2019, the first day of the tournament.

On 6 March 2019 CONMEBOL published the lists of ten teams.

Group A

Peru
Peru announced their squad of 23 players on 6 March 2019.

Head coach: Carlos Silvestri

Ecuador
Head coach: Javier Rodríguez

The 23-man squad was announced on 7 March 2019.

Bolivia
Head coach:  Sixto Vizuete

The 23-man squad was announced on 13 March 2019.

Venezuela
Head coach: José Baudilio Hernández

The 23-man squad was announced on 1 March 2019.

Chile
Head coach:  Hernán Caputto

The 23-man squad was announced on 7 March 2019.

Group B

Brazil
Head coach: Guilherme Dalla Déa

The 23-man squad was announced on 1 March 2019.

Argentina
Head coach: Pablo Aimar

The 23-man squad was announced on 2 March 2019.

Colombia
Head coach: Héctor Cárdenas

The 23-man squad was announced on 18 March 2019.

Uruguay
Head coach: Alejandro Garay

The 23-man squad was announced on 27 February 2019.

Paraguay
Head coach: Gustavo Morínigo

The 23-man squad was announced on 23 February 2019.

References

South American Under-17 Football Championship squads